The Filmfare Award for Best Male Debut is given by Filmfare as part of its annual Filmfare Awards for Hindi films to recognise a performance by a male actor in a debut role.

List of winners

1980s
1989 Aamir Khan – Qayamat Se Qayamat Tak as Rajveer "Raj" Singh

1990s 
 1990 Sooraj Barjatya – Maine Pyar Kiya as debut director
 1991 Not Awarded
 1992 Ajay Devgan – Phool Aur Kaante as Ajay Salgaonkar
 1993 Shah Rukh Khan – Deewana as Raja Sahai
 1994 Saif Ali Khan – Aashiq Awara as Jaidev "Jai" Singh/Jimmy/Rakesh Rajpal
 1995 No award (Awarded to 2 actresses)
 1996 Bobby Deol – Barsaat as Badal
 1997 Chandrachur Singh – Maachis as Kripal Singh a.k.a. Pali
 1998 Akshaye Khanna – Himalay Putra as Abhay Khanna
 1999 Fardeen Khan – Prem Aggan as Suraj Singh

2000s 
 2000 Rahul Khanna – 1947: Earth as Hassan
 2001 Hrithik Roshan – Kaho Naa... Pyaar Hai as Rohit & Raj Chopra (Only actor to receive Best Actor Award in the same year)
 2002 Tusshar Kapoor – Mujhe Kucch Kehna Hai as Karan Sharma
 2003 Vivek Oberoi – Company as Chandrakant "Chandu" Nagre (Only actor to receive Best Supporting Actor Award in the same year)
 2004 Shahid Kapoor – Ishq Vishk as Rajiv Mathur
 2005 Not Awarded
 2006 Shiney Ahuja – Hazaaron Khwaishein Aisi as Vikram Malhotra
2007 Not Awarded

 2008 Ranbir Kapoor – Saawariya as Ranbir Raj
 2009 Farhan Akhtar – Rock On!! as Aditya Shroff (Adi) & Imran Khan – Jaane Tu... Ya Jaane Na as Jai "Ratz" Singh Rathore a.k.a. Mowgli

2010s 
 2010 Not Awarded
 2011 Ranveer Singh – Band Baaja Baaraat as Bittoo Sharma
 2012 Vidyut Jamwal – Force as Vishnu Reddy
 2013 Ayushmann Khurrana – Vicky Donor as Vikram "Vicky" Arora a.k.a. Vicky Donor (Only actor/singer to receive Best Playback Singer Male Award in the same year)
 2014 Dhanush – Raanjhanaa as Kundan Shankar
 2015 Fawad Khan – Khoobsurat as Yuvraj Vikram Singh Rathore
 2016 Sooraj Pancholi – Hero as Sooraj Kaushik
 2017 Diljit Dosanjh – Udta Punjab as ASI Sartaj Singh
 2018 Not Awarded
 2019 Ishaan Khatter – Beyond the Clouds as Amir Ahmed

2020s 
 2020 Abhimanyu Dassani – Mard Ko Dard Nahi Hota as Suryaanshu "Surya" Sampat
 2021 Not Awarded
 2022 Ehan Bhat – 99 Songs as Jay

See also
 Filmfare Awards
 Bollywood

Notes

References

External links
Filmfare Awards Best Male Debut

Male Debut